Severna Park is a census-designated place (CDP) in Anne Arundel County, Maryland, United States. Severna Park's population was 37,634 at the 2010 census.

History
The name Severna Park is rumored to originate from a 1906 contest held by Oscar Hatton while the modern community was first becoming established. The winner would receive a portion of land but controversy arose because the winner was an African-American woman, who was instead rewarded $500. However, extensive research by local historian Nelson Molter found no corroborative evidence for this story, suggesting the naming contest is merely a local myth.

Robinson House was listed on the National Register of Historic Places in 2009. Severna Park was originally named "Boone," and was a stop along the Baltimore & Annapolis Railroad, which was converted to the B&A Rail Trail in 1990. Severna Park is also home to the Severn School, a private high school established in 1914 by Rolland Teel as a feeder school to the United States Naval Academy, as well as several other old homes and buildings.

In many Slavic languages, Severna means "northern".

Geography and transportation

Severna Park is split by Ritchie Highway (Maryland Route 2), which runs between Baltimore and Annapolis and directly through Severna Park, serving as one of the main thoroughfares in the area. Other main roads include Benfield Road and Baltimore-Annapolis Boulevard (Maryland Route 648). Interstate 97 runs from Annapolis to Baltimore directly west of Severna Park, passing through Millersville. Severna Park is accessible from I-97 via exit 10 to Benfield Boulevard/Veterans Highway.

Severna Park is served by the Maryland Transit Administration's Route 70. A large portion of the Baltimore & Annapolis Trail also runs through Severna Park. The trail, which is now a bike trail, was originally a rail trail before being converted as part of the East Coast Greenway in 1996. The trail's headquarters are located on Earleigh Heights Road in Severna Park.

Demographics

As of the census of 2000, there were 28,507 people, 9,731 households, and 8,105 families residing in the CDP. The racial makeup of the CDP was 92.45% White, 3.29% African American, 0.18% Native American, 2.77% Asian, 0.04% Pacific Islander, 0.32% from other races, 1.19% Hispanic or Latino and 0.94% from two or more races. 

There were 9,731 households, out of which 40.9% had children under the age of 18 living with them, 73.7% were married couples living together, 6.8% had a female householder with no husband present, and 16.7% were non-families. 13.4% of all households were made up of individuals, and 5.8% had someone living alone who was 65 years of age or older. The average household size was 2.89 and the average family size was 3.17 people.

In the CDP, the population was spread out, with 28.1% under the age of 18, 4.9% from 18 to 24, 25.9% from 25 to 44, 29.0% from 45 to 64, and 12.1% who were 65 years of age or older. The median age was 40 years. For every 100 females, there were 94.7 males. For every 100 females age 18 and over, there were 91.5 males.

According to a 2007 estimate, the median income for a household in the CDP was $106,983, and the median income for a family was $116,246. Males had a median income of $70,742 versus $45,061 for females. The per capita income for the CDP was $40,985. About 0.6% of families and 1.2% of the population were below the poverty line, including 0.4% of those under age 18 and 3.0% of those age 65 or over.

Local schools
Public and private schools in Severna Park are:
 Severna Park Elementary School
 Jones Elementary School
 Oak Hill Elementary School
 Folger McKinsey Elementary School
 Benfield Elementary
 Shipley's Choice Elementary School (technically in Millersville, but part of Severna Park feeder system)
 Severna Park Middle School
 St. John the Evangelist School 
 St. Martin's in the Field Day School 
 Severna Park High School
 Severn School

Notable people
 Josh Banks, professional baseball player
 Bud Beardmore, former American lacrosse coach
 Steve Bisciotti, owner of the Baltimore Ravens
 Dan Bongino, American conservative political commentator
 Mark Budzinski, former professional baseball player and current first base coach for the Toronto Blue Jays
 Henry W. Buse Jr., Lieutenant general in the Marine Corps 
 Lauren Faust,  American Emmy-Award-winning animator, writer, director, and producer; story developer for The Powerpuff Girls and My Little Pony: Friendship Is Magic
 Gavin Floyd, former professional baseball player
 Steve Gorman, drummer for the American rock band The Black Crowes
 Jeff Hatch, former professional football player and actor
 Marjorie Holt, U.S. congresswoman
 Cornelia MacIntyre Foley (1909–2010), artist
 Ronald Malfi, novelist
 John Marburger, American physicist; former director, the Office of Science and Technology Policy; former President of Stony Brook University; former director of Brookhaven National Laboratory 
 Billy Martin, Good Charlotte guitarist
 Paul Massaro
 Eric Milton, former professional baseball player
 Max Ochs, Takoma Records guitarist
 Gordon Byrom Rogers, United States Army Lieutenant General
 Mitchell T. Rozanski, American prelate of the Roman Catholic Church
 Pat Sajak, American game show host
 Mark Teixeira, former professional baseball player
 Jarred Tinordi, professional hockey player 
 Mark Tinordi, former hockey player for the Washington Capitals; principal owner of Severna Park Taphouse
 Frank Valentino, American operatic baritone
 Steve Wojciechowski, Head Men's Basketball Coach at Marquette University
 Drew Yates, professional soccer player

References

External links

 Severna Park Voice
Greater Severna Park and Arnold Chamber of Commerce

 
Census-designated places in Maryland
Census-designated places in Anne Arundel County, Maryland
Maryland populated places on the Chesapeake Bay